Mahatma Gandhi College is a college in Thiruvananthapuram, Kerala, India. It was founded by to Mannathu Padmanabhan, the founder of the Nair Service Society. The college is affiliated to Kerala University and is managed by Nair Service Society.
The pioneer institution in Thiruvananthapuram having "College with potential for excellence" awarded by NAAC. As per the 2019 NIRF rankings, Mahatma Gandhi College stands at 68th rank in India and fourth rank in Thiruvananthapuram.

History
The college started functioning at Vadassery Amma Veedu at Perunthanni in 1948 and was later shifted to the present site at Kattachakkonam, now known as Kesavadasapuram. Late C. Rajagopalachari, the last Governor General of India, laid the foundation stone for the new building on 22 August 1948.

The Arts section was shifted to the building in 1949, and the Science section in 1950. The main building was completed in 1958 and was inaugurated by Pandit Jawaharlal Nehru, the first Prime Minister of India, on 24 April 1958. The college celebrated its Silver Jubilee in 1974–75. The foundation stone of the three-storeyed Mannam Memorial Block was laid by Sri. P. K. Narayana Panicker, General Secretary of the Nair Service Society (NSS) on 23 April 1989, and the block upon completionwas inaugurated by Dr. Swaroop Singh, the then Governor of Kerala, on 2 October,  1990.

In April 2013, the principal of Mahatma Gandhi College objected to the Akhil Bharatiya Vidyarthi Parishad (ABVP) college unit collecting money for an "evening farewell money". In a related event, the Kerala Women's Commission, after learning that student activists had detained a girl student for more than seven hours, launched its own inquiry.

On 29 July 2013, starting at around 10:30 am, several students and outsiders, suspected to be ABVP activists and sympathizers, hurled crude explosives and damaged college property at Mahatma Gandhi College. Police swung batons to disperse the students and detained 10 of them (though some of those detained could have been innocent). Following the incident, a "Special Investigation Team" was set up to investigate the incident, and Thiruvanchoor Radhakrishnan visited the college to see the damage. Due to clashes between the Students' Federation of India (SFI) and the ABVP, campus politics is banned as of 2019 per a High Court order.

Overview 

The college has 4,000 students, 13 degree and eight postgraduate courses. Besides providing research facilities in various disciplines, the college has started an Instrumentation course attached to the Department of Physics.

Programs of study

Notable alumni
Mohanlal
Madhu
Murali
Padmarajan
Adoor Bhasi
Priyadarshan
Anil Nedumangad
Sooraj Santhosh
M Vijayakumar
KN Balagopal
Thennala Balakrishna Pillai
Shaji Kailas
Baiju
Manikuttan
Saji Surendran
Arun Kumar Aravind
Santhosh
V. Madhusoodanan Nair
Jobby Justin
Justice Paripoornan
 Kavalam Sreekumar
 G. R. Anil
 Dr. P. Padmesh

See also

 Colleges in Thiruvananthapuram
 Education in Kerala
 Nair Service Society

References

External links

Arts and Science colleges in Kerala
Colleges affiliated to the University of Kerala
Colleges in Thiruvananthapuram
Nair Service Society colleges
1948 establishments in India
Educational institutions established in 1948